Cyclopentadienyltungsten tricarbonyl dimer is the organotungsten compound with the formula Cp2W2(CO)6, where Cp is C5H5.  A dark red crystalline solid, it is the subject of research, although it has no or few practical uses.

Structure and synthesis
The molecule exists in two rotamers, gauche and anti. The six CO ligands are terminal, and the W-W bond distance is 3.222 Å. The compound is prepared by treatment of tungsten hexacarbonyl with sodium cyclopentadienide followed by oxidation of the resulting NaW(CO)3(C5H5).

Related compounds
 Cyclopentadienylmolybdenum tricarbonyl dimer
 Cyclopentadienylchromium tricarbonyl dimer

References

Organotungsten compounds
Carbonyl complexes
Dimers (chemistry)
Half sandwich compounds
Cyclopentadienyl complexes
Chemical compounds containing metal–metal bonds